A pedalo (British English) or paddle boat (U.S., Canadian, and Australian English) is a human-powered watercraft propelled by the action of pedals turning a paddle wheel.

Description
A pedalo is a human-powered watercraft propelled by the turning of a paddle wheel. The wheel is turned by people of rotating the pedals of the craft. The paddle wheel of a pedalo is a smaller version of that used by a paddle steamer.

Use
Pedalos, being particularly suited to calm waters, are often hired out for use on ponds and small lakes in urban parks.

Designs
The earliest record of a pedalo is perhaps Leonardo da Vinci's diagram of a craft driven by two pedals.

Typically, a two-seat pedalo has two sets of pedals side-by-side, designed to be used together. Some models, however, have three pedals on each side, to allow a person boating alone to pedal from a centrally seated position.

References

External links
 

Boat types
Human-powered watercraft
Water sports
Water sports equipment